is a Japanese manga artist.

Career 
Yamashita started publishing Doujinshi in the early 2000s and won the newcomers prize Afternoon Shiki Shou of the manga magazine Monthly Afternoon in 2005 with a short story.

She started her career by publishing Boys Love manga. In 2007, her manga Dining Bar Akira was ranked first in the Kono Manga ga Sugoi! survey in the category Boys Love. This manga and the short story collection Black-Winged Love were published in English by Netcomics as books, several more of her early works also in digital form.

Yamashita has published her work across the classical gendered spectrum of the Japanese manga industry. Her work appears in Boys Love magazines and josei magazines like Feel Young, but also in seinen magazines like Monthly Afternoon.

The manga Her was the highest ranked manga for female readers in the 2010 Kono Manga ga Sugoi! survey.

The manga series The Night Beyond the Tricornered Window, which she published from 2013 until 2020 in Magazine Be × Boy, is her biggest success so far. It was adapted into an anime series and a live-action film. The series was sold more than one million times and translated into several languages.

Her series Ikoku Nikki has been ranked high on the Kono Manga ga Sugoi! survey and has been nominated for the Manga Taishō award in 2019 and 2020.

In 2021, Yamashita acknowledged her works have become more politically progressive and she states she was influenced by overseas films. To mitigate that, she tried to introduce diversity in subtle ways, such as drawing female police officers with male police officers.

Works 

 
 
 
 
 
 
 Her (2009–2010)
 BUTTER!!! (2010–2013)

References

External links 
 

1981 births
Living people
Manga artists
Women manga artists